Bromo adjacent homology domain containing 1 (BAHD1) is a protein that in humans is encoded by the BAHD1 gene. BAHD1 is involved in heterochromatin formation and transcriptional repression.

Discovery 
BAHD1 was first cloned from a human brain cDNA library and the coding sequence was named KIAA0945. Bierne and colleagues further discovered the function of BAHD1 in the regulation of chromatin structure and gene expression.

Function 
BAHD1 acts as a co-repressor by interacting with a set of proteins that promote chromatin compaction and regulate transcription. Tandem-affinity purification of the BAHD1-associated protein complex in human HEK293 cells identified MIER proteins (MIER1, MIER2, MIER3), histone deacetylase HDAC1 and HDAC2, histone H3K9 methyltransferase EHMT2, heterochromatin protein 1 (HP1 alpha, HP1 beta, HP1 gamma), MBD1, TRIM28 and CDYL as partners of BAHD1. Overexpression of BAHD1 in HEK293 cells induces large-scale chromatin condensation  and DNA methylation on autosomes. The C-terminal BAH domain of BAHD1 acts as a reader for the epigenetic mark H3K27me3. Ectopically expressed BAHD1 colocalizes with the heterochromatic inactive X chromosome (Xi).

Animal studies 
Ablation of the Bahd1 gene in the mouse alters placental development and results in hypocholesterolemia, hypoglycemia and decreased body fat. Bahd1-haplodeficiency in mice decreases the efficiency of infection with the bacterial pathogen Listeria monocytogenes.

Clinical significance 
During infection of human epithelial cells with the pathogen Listeria monocytogenes, BAHD1 represses interferon-stimulated genes. At specific stages of infection, a Listeria nucleomodulin, LntA, acts as an inhibitor of BAHD1 and activates interferon-stimulated genes. The BAHD1 gene is downregulated in the colon tissue in a mouse model of ulcerative colitis.

References

Further reading 

Human proteins